Cover your ass (British: cover your arse), abbreviated CYA, is an activity done by an individual to protect themselves from possible subsequent criticism, legal penalties, or other repercussions, usually in a work-related or bureaucratic context. In one sense, it may be rightful steps to protect oneself properly while in a difficult situation, such as what steps to take to protect oneself after being fired. But, in a different sense, according to The New York Times language expert William Safire, it describes "the bureaucratic technique of averting future accusations of policy error or wrongdoing by deflecting responsibility in advance". It often involves diffusing responsibility for one's actions as a form of insurance against possible future negative repercussions. It can denote a type of institutional risk-averse mentality which works against accountability and responsibility, often characterized by excessive paperwork and documentation, which can be harmful to the institution's overall effectiveness. The activity, sometimes seen as instinctive, is generally unnecessary towards accomplishing the goals of the organization, but helpful to protect a particular individual's career within it, and it can be seen as a type of institutional corruption working against individual initiative.

Usage
The phrase cover your ass is generally viewed as a vulgar term, often replaced by the less-vulgar sounding initials CYA. Safire identified CYA as a synecdoche, in the same sense that the word "ass" had come to reference the whole person. The word "ass" in the phrase is often replaced with more polite versions or other euphemisms, such as "cover your actions", "cover your rear end", or "cover your butt", according to Safire. The "cover your butt" variant has been used in various ways, such as by Minnesota health authorities urging citizens to undergo preventive colorectal exams, as a way to "cover" themselves medically from possible future cancer. In banking, officers tasked with making sure the bank follows proper regulatory procedures, called compliance officers, may realize that certain dubious transactions, such as money laundering and terrorist financing, will occur regardless of any regulatory restrictions; still, to protect themselves and their banks against possible future sanctions, they may engage in CYA activity such as issuing unnecessary memos, obfuscating documents or conducting transactions discreetly, as ways to absolve themselves from possible future liability. The term is widely used in journalism. Safire explained how the term is used in bureaucracy:

In the novel The Negotiator  by Frederick Forsyth, CYA finds mention as:

Because these practices are so routine, a genuine warning can be mistaken for CYA behavior, causing a type II error or false-negative error, with disastrous results. For example, in the summer preceding the attacks of 9/11, U.S. president George W. Bush was briefed on a now-famous August 6, 2001, memo titled Bin Ladin Determined To Strike in US. Bush's response to the briefer was erroneously reported as: "All right. You've covered your ass, now."

In another example, before the launch of the United States spaceship Challenger which ended tragically with the Space Shuttle Challenger disaster, the final launch approval by rocket maker Morton Thiokol contained the phrase "information on this page was prepared to support an oral presentation and cannot be considered complete without the oral discussion"; this notice was later described as a "CYA notice" by information design specialist Edward Tufte. In print, it can have the form of a disclaimer; for example, Slate magazine suggested that the White House used the phrase "It is important not to read too much into any one monthly report" as a disclaimer on reports, and this was described as a CYA activity. The term has been applied in the medical profession to describe doctors who prescribe unnecessary medical tests for patients, to protect themselves against possible future lawsuits. The term has been used to describe a cultural tendency which works against accountability and risk-taking, such as in a war effort when generals engage in much cover your ass activity which avoids taking real responsibility.

In regards to Congressional impeachment hearings into President Donald Trump's talks with Ambassador Gordon Sondland, on October 16, 2019, Member of Congress Jackie Speier (D-Calif.) told reporters that she was not sure whether lawmakers can trust Sondland's testimony to the House, saying his opening statement was "a lot of CYA."

In an op-ed's inferred example regarding Trump's speech prior to the 2021 storming of the United States Capitol, The Washington Post columnist Dana Milbank juxtaposed two of Trump's statements as evidence:

See also
Due diligence
Mistakes were made
Plausible deniability
Principal–agent problem

Footnotes

Risk management
Slang
Prevention
Public administration